The Adventure Babies were a Stafford-based Britpop band, founded by Matt Tedstone, Dave Atherton and Jez Bramwell in 1990. The band had three releases on the Factory Records label:
 The Camper Van (EP) (FAC 319, 1991)
 Laugh (album) (FACT 335, 1992)
 "Barking Mad" (single) (FACT 347, 1992)

Possibly their greatest claim to fame was being the last band signed by Factory Records before it went bankrupt.  At the time of Factory's bankruptcy in 1992, test pressings had been made of a second single from the Laugh album, the title track Laugh.

The band continued playing with new guitarist Vulch (Bryan Wilkin), formerly working with Martin Hannett and seeking a new recording contract  for a year.

To tie in with their final gig, a second album, Once Upon A Time The End, was issued in 2005, on CD only.

In 2018 this was followed by a digital-only album release, Extracts of the Next.

References

Musical groups from Manchester
Factory Records artists
English pop music groups
English rock music groups
Musical groups established in 1990
Musical groups disestablished in 2005
1990 establishments in England
Britpop groups